California High may refer to:
 California High School (disambiguation), multiple schools with the name
 California High, a fainting game